Boris Yuryevich Kovalchuk (born December 1, 1977 in Leningrad, Russian SFSR, Soviet Union) is a Russian official. He is a son of Yury Kovalchuk.

Since April 19, 2006, he has led the Department of the Russian Government's Staff for implementation of the National Priority Projects.

Sanctions
In December 2022 the EU sanctioned Boris Kovalchuk in relation to the 2022 Russian invasion of Ukraine.

References

Profile.ru. Сын за отца 

Politicians from Saint Petersburg
1977 births
Living people
21st-century Russian politicians